Román Golobart Benet (born 21 March 1992) is a Spanish professional footballer who plays for Cypriot club Nea Salamis Famagusta FC as a central defender.

Club career

Wigan Athletic
Born in Barcelona, Catalonia, 17-year-old Golobart signed for Wigan Athletic from RCD Espanyol on 7 August 2009 as new manager Roberto Martínez identified him as a future talent. Despite appearances in pre-season friendlies and on the substitutes bench, he failed to play a competitive match in his first two seasons at the club, and in August 2011 was loaned to Scottish Premier League side Inverness Caledonian Thistle for six months. He made his debut the following day at Pittodrie against Aberdeen, but was unaccustomed to the pace of Scottish football and made two significant errors during the 1–2 away loss.

Golobart scored his first goal for Inverness on 24 December 2011, also against Aberdeen but now in a 2–1 home win. Shortly before the game he had expressed a desire to extend his loan spell, which eventually befell under manager Terry Butcher, with the pair having previously been engaged in a heated discussion during training, and he made his last appearance for the club in a 1–0 away victory over St Mirren, also winning the Young Player of the Year award.

On 31 August 2012, Golobart joined Tranmere Rovers on a one-month loan deal. He made his debut a day later in a 4–0 win against Colchester United, but failed to play again for his new team following Ash Taylor's early return from injury.

Golobart played his first match for Wigan on 5 January 2013, in the third round of the FA Cup against Bournemouth. He made his Premier League debut for the Latics that same month, starting at Stoke City in a 2–2 draw.

FC Köln
At the end of the 2012–13 season, Golobart turned down a new deal with Wigan and signed a three-year contract with 1. FC Köln. He made his debut in the 2. Bundesliga on 20 July 2013, playing the full 90 minutes in a 1–1 away draw against Dynamo Dresden.

In February 2015, Golobart was loaned to FC Erzgebirge Aue also in the German second division for the remainder of the campaign.

Return to Spain
On 21 August 2015, Golobart returned to his homeland, signing a one-year deal with the option of a second at third-tier club Racing de Ferrol, contributing two goals from 36 appearances as they reached the play-offs. The following 23 July, he transferred to fellow league team Real Murcia.

After the latter's defeat to Valencia CF Mestalla in the playoffs, Golobart joined Elche CF in June 2017. In November, his club warned him over controversial online comments relating to the political unrest in his native region. The following January, having rescinded his contract at the Estadio Manuel Martínez Valero, he moved to Mérida AD also from division three.

International career
Golobart represented Spain at under-17 level. His first cap came in a 1–1 draw with England.

Personal life
Golobart's father, Joan, was also a footballer. He also represented Espanyol, but at senior level.

Golobart shared his birthdate with fellow Espanyol youth graduate Jordi Amat.

Club statistics

Honours
Wigan Athletic
FA Cup: 2012–13

References

External links

1992 births
Living people
Spanish footballers
Footballers from Barcelona
Association football defenders
Segunda División B players
RCD Espanyol footballers
Racing de Ferrol footballers
Real Murcia players
Elche CF players
Mérida AD players
Premier League players
English Football League players
Wigan Athletic F.C. players
Tranmere Rovers F.C. players
Scottish Premier League players
Inverness Caledonian Thistle F.C. players
2. Bundesliga players
1. FC Köln players
FC Erzgebirge Aue players
Cypriot First Division players
Cypriot Second Division players
Nea Salamis Famagusta FC players
AEK Larnaca FC players
Doxa Katokopias FC players
Israeli Premier League players
Maccabi Netanya F.C. players
Spain youth international footballers
Spanish expatriate footballers
Expatriate footballers in England
Expatriate footballers in Scotland
Expatriate footballers in Germany
Expatriate footballers in Cyprus
Expatriate footballers in Israel
Spanish expatriate sportspeople in England
Spanish expatriate sportspeople in Scotland
Spanish expatriate sportspeople in Germany
Spanish expatriate sportspeople in Cyprus
Spanish expatriate sportspeople in Israel